Beulah Woolston (August 3, 1828 – October 24, 1886) was a pioneering American missionary teacher in China. With her sister, she founded schools, translated textbooks, and edited a Chinese-language newspaper.

Early life and education
Beulah Woolston was born near Vincentown, New Jersey, on August 3, 1828. She was raised in a Christian home, and was converted and united with the church when about fifteen years old. After receiving preliminary education in her native place, she went with Miss Sarah H. Woolston, her sister and her life associate in home and work, to the Wesleyan Female College, at Wilmington, Delaware, where she was graduated with honor from both English and classical departments.

Career
She afterward taught for some years in the college, before responding to the call for missionary teachers in the China Mission. The sisters sailed for China, along with Phebe Potter (who soon married Erastus Wentworth), October 4, 1858. After a voyage of 147 days around the Cape of Good Hope, they landed at Shanghai, February 27, 1859, and reached Fuzhou, March 19. Their special work was to organize and superintend a boarding school for Chinese girls under the auspices of the China Female Missionary Society of Baltimore. The sisters were sent out by the parent board, American Methodist Episcopal Mission, but their school was supported by the Ladies’ China Missionary Society of Baltimore (founded in 1848).

In 1859, they founded a training school for teachers in Fuzhou. Known as "Uk Ing", it was a girls’ boarding school. They overcome the natural prejudices of the people, emphasized by the wrongs done them by foreign traders, and the lack of books, maps, charts for a well-established school. When Bishop John Burdon, of the Church of England, visited the school, he declared it to be the best-conducted girls' school in China.

The sisters' aim was to teach the girls such instruction as would make them useful in their own homes and in the spheres they must occupy in life, feeling that they could not conscientiously give time to teach anything that could be of no possible use to them in the future. In addition to the care of this school, hundreds of women visited them at their home. Every effort was made to utilize their visits for teaching. In addition to caring for the schools, the sisters provided many of the girls with clothing, teaching them to make their own, to cook, wash, and other details for the education of good housewives.

Even vacation days were busy, as they had to provide homes for many of the girls during the time. They also established a number of day schools at different and often distant points in their work, which they visited regularly, and often at great inconvenience and exposure to themselves. With all of this work, they found time for literary work such as preparation and translation of schoolbooks, as well as the editing of the Child's Illustrated Paper in Chinese.

During their twenty-five years' service they returned to the United States twice for rest and to recruit. In 1871, when the Ladies’ China Society became a part of the Methodist Episcopal Woman's Foreign Missionary Society, the Woolston sisters became its first missionaries.

Later life
In December, 1883, both sisters were ill, and returned to the U.S. for the last time. At times, Beulah seemed to improve. On October 24, 1886, she grew much worse, and died, at Mount Holly, New Jersey.

Selected works
 1877, "Feet Binding"

References

Attribution

Bibliography
 

1828 births
1886 deaths
People from Southampton Township, New Jersey
American Christian missionaries
Methodist missionaries in China
American translators
Women newspaper editors
19th-century American women writers
Educators from New Jersey
American women educators
Wesleyan Female College (Wilmington) alumni
Missionary linguists